A traumatic neuroma  is a type of neuroma which results from trauma to a nerve, usually during a surgical procedure.  The most common oral locations are on the tongue and near the mental foramen of the mouth. They are relatively rare on the head and neck.

See also 
 List of cutaneous conditions

References

External links 

Diseases of oral cavity, salivary glands and jaws
Neurocutaneous conditions
Nervous system neoplasia